The 2025 FIBA AmeriCup qualification is a basketball competition that is being played from February 2022 to February 2025, to determine the FIBA Americas nations who qualify for the 2025 FIBA AmeriCup.

Sub-zone pre-qualifiers

Central America
The tournament was held in Managua, Nicaragua.

All times are local (UTC−6).

References

External links 
Qualifiers
Tournament summary

FIBA AmeriCup qualification